This is a list of Tweenies episodes. Tweenies is a television programme aimed at young children, formerly broadcast on the BBC's CBBC strand from 1999 until 2002, then the CBeebies channel from 2002 until 2016.

Series overview

Episodes

Series 1 (1999)

Series 2 (2000)

Series 3 (2000)

Series 4 (2000)

Series 5 (2000–01)

Series 6 (2001)

Series 7 (2001–02)

Welsh episodes

In 2002, the BBC dubbed several episodes into Welsh for S4C (BBC provides some programming to the Welsh channel). Dubbing was done by actors including John Ogwen and Jennifer Vaughan.

Tweenies Christmas Countdown (2001)

Be Safe with the Tweenies

A series of special short episodes focussing on safety, entitled Be Safe with the Tweenies, were shown on CBeebies and BBC Two between 2002 and 2009.

Expanded 40-minute episodes 

In 2001, following the success of the Teletubbies omnibus editions which were broadcast on the BBC on Sunday mornings, 18 40-minute episodes of the Tweenies were produced, which featured the Tweenies at home instead of playgroup, usually in their bedroom, talking about recent & past episodes from Series 4-6 which were originally broadcast in 2000–2001, with clips. These were shown intermittently in the UK on BBC Two in 2001 and BBC One in 2001 and 2003. They were last repeated in 2007 on CBeebies.

VHS titles

DVD titles

External links
BBC Programmes - CBeebies - Tweenies
BBC Programmes - CBeebies - Tweenies episode guide

References

Lists of British children's television series episodes